John Parkhurst (c. 1512–1575) was an English bishop of the 16th century.

John Parkhurst may also refer to:

John Parkhurst (Master of Balliol) (1564–1639), English cleric and academic
John Parkhurst (MP) (1643–1741), English politician, MP for Northamptonshire, Brackley and Durham City
John Parkhurst (lexicographer) (1728–1797), English academic, clergyman and biblical scholar 
John Adelbert Parkhurst (1861–1925), American astronomer
John C. Parkhurst (1920-2009), American lawyer and politician
John Gibson Parkhurst (1824–1906), officer in the Union Army during the American Civil War and later diplomat